Eyal Press (born 1970) is an American author and journalist based in New York City. He is the author of three books and is a contributor to The New Yorker and The New York Times, among other publications. Much of Press' writing and journalism focuses on topics of morality and social and economic inequality.

Early life and education 
Eyal Press was born in Jerusalem in 1970. His father, Shalom, was a gynecologist and abortion provider born to a Russian Jewish family that had immigrated to Mandatory Palestine. His mother, Carla, was born in a concentration camp in Transnistria during the Holocaust. In 1973, the family immigrated from Israel to Buffalo, New York for Shalom's obstetrics and gynecology residency. Press was raised in Buffalo.

Press received a B.A. in history from Brown University in 1992. He later earned a Ph.D. from New York University.

Works

References 

Press, Eyal
People from Buffalo, New York
Brown University alumni
New York University alumni
21st-century American non-fiction writers
1970 births
Living people